The Battle Branch Mine, sometimes referred to as the Battle Creek Mine, was located near the town of Auraria in Lumpkin County, Georgia. Gold was first discovered there in 1831.  During the Georgia Gold Rush, before the Gold Lottery of 1832, men from several different states were all working in the same stream when a dispute over the possession of the place ended in a fight in which a number of men were seriously wounded, providing the name for the mine ultimately located there.  After the American Civil War, William John Turner Hutcheson, who served with the Blue Ridge Rifles, a Confederate fighting unit from Dahlonega, Georgia, became superintendent of the Battle Branch gold mine.  The mine continued producing gold well into the 1900s, producing 661.28 ounces (20.568 kg) of gold in 1935.

There is some confusion as to the actual location of the mine.  The United States Geological Survey lists two mines named Battle Branch Mine.  Both are to the west of Auraria, but one is on the west side of the Etowah River and the other is on the east side of the Etowah River.

References

External links
TopoQuest Map showing west location of Battle Branch Mine
TopoQuest Map showing east location of Battle Branch Mine

Suggested reading
Parks, C. F., and R. A. Wilson. The Battle Branch Gold Mine, Auraria, Georgia. Atlanta, 1934.

Georgia Gold Rush
Gold mines in Georgia
Geology of Georgia (U.S. state)
Mines in Lumpkin County, Georgia